Antonín Kasper Sr. (1932–2017) was an international speedway rider from Czechoslovakia.

Speedway career 
Kasper Sr. won two medals at the Speedway World Team Cup in 1960 and 1963. 

He rode in the top tier of British Speedway from riding for Coventry Bees and West Ham Hammers. He also won the prestigious Golden Helmet of Pardubice in 1963.

World final appearances

World Team Cup
 1960 -  Göteborg, Ullevi (with Jaroslav Machač / František Richter / Luboš Tomíček Sr. / Bohumír Bartoněk) - 3rd - 15pts (5)
 1961 -  Wrocław, Olympic Stadium (with Luboš Tomíček Sr. / Stanislav Svoboda / Bohumír Bartoněk) - 4th - 12pts (4)
 1963 -  Vienna, Stadion Wien (with Stanislav Kubíček / Miroslav Šmíd / Luboš Tomíček Sr. - 2nd - 27pts (10)
 1968 -  London, Wembley Stadium (with Luboš Tomíček Sr. / Jaroslav Volf / Jan Holub I) - 4th' - 7pts (3)

Individual Ice Speedway World Championship
1966 -  2 rounds, 7th - 30pts
1968 -  2 rounds, 7th - 33pts
1969 -  Inzell, 6th - 9pts
1970 -  Nässjö, 14th - 3pts

Family
His son Antonín Kasper Jr. (1962-2006) was also an international speedway rider.

References 

1932 births
2017 deaths
Czech speedway riders
Coventry Bees riders
West Ham Hammers riders